Sir Trevor Herbert Harry Skeet (28 January 1918 – 14 August 2004) was a New Zealand-born lawyer and a British Conservative Party politician.

Early life

Skeet was born in Auckland, New Zealand and was educated at King's College, Auckland and the University of Auckland. He served with the New Zealand Army and Navy during World War II. He was a barrister and solicitor at the Supreme Court of New Zealand and was called to the English Bar in 1947 by Inner Temple. He was a member of the Council of the Royal Empire Society.

Political career

Skeet first stood for Parliament in Stoke Newington and Hackney North in 1951 and Llanelli in 1955. He was elected Member of Parliament for Willesden East in 1959, losing the seat in 1964. He was then MP for Bedford 1970-83 and North Bedfordshire 1983–97. Ahead of the 1992 election, he survived a deselection attempt by his constituency party. In the 1992-1997 Parliament, Skeet rebelled frequently against John Major's ailing government, on issues such as the Maastricht Treaty; Skeet was a staunch Eurosceptic. Indeed, Skeet was one of only eight Conservative MPs who voted against Major's government more than 50 times.

Personal life

He was survived by his widow, Lady Skeet, who resides in Milton Ernest, Bedfordshire. He was knighted in 1986.

References

External links 
Guardian obituary
 

1918 births
2004 deaths
Conservative Party (UK) MPs for English constituencies
UK MPs 1959–1964
UK MPs 1970–1974
UK MPs 1974
UK MPs 1974–1979
UK MPs 1979–1983
UK MPs 1983–1987
UK MPs 1987–1992
UK MPs 1992–1997
University of Auckland alumni
People educated at King's College, Auckland
20th-century New Zealand lawyers
New Zealand emigrants to England
New Zealand expatriates in England
New Zealand military personnel of World War II
Politicians awarded knighthoods
New Zealand Knights Bachelor
British Eurosceptics